The German Banking Act Kreditwesengesetz (KWG) literally means law of the banking system, is the primary legally implementation of the Basel Accords. It is binding for banks and other institutes providing financial services (German: :de:Kreditinstitute und :de:Finanzdienstleistungsinstitute) in Germany and effective since January 1935, but updated in 1962.

Purpose 
The main goals of the KWG are:
 To guarantee and safeguard the functionality of banks (literally in German: Sicherung und Erhaltung der Funktionsfähigkeit der Kreditwirtschaft)
 To safeguard the creditors from losing their invested capital, i.e. any kind of share (literally in German: Schutz der Gläubiger von Kreditinstituten vor Verlust ihrer Einlagen)

The Kreditwesengesetz imposes restriction on risk-related business activities and extends the duty of disclosure. It ensures competences of regulators and is the legal justification of the German Solvability Directive (SolvV) and MaRisk, the corresponding regulation with more detailed definitions and requirements.

See also
Sarbanes–Oxley Act on similar topics legally binding within the US

References (in German) 

 Carl-Theodor Samm, Axel Kokemoor (Hrsg.) u. a.: Gesetz über das Kreditwesen (KWG). Kommentar mit Materialien und ergänzenden Vorschriften. Loseblattwerk, 168. Auflage, C.F. Müller Verlag, Heidelberg, August 2013, .
 Günther Luz u. a. (Hrsg.): Kreditwesengesetz. Kommentar zum KWG inklusive SolvV, LiqV, GroMiKV, MaRisk. 2. Auflage, Schäffer-Poeschl Verlag, Stuttgart 2011, .
 Friedrich Reischauer, Joachim Kleinhändler (Begr.) u. a.: Kreditwesengesetz (KWG). Kommentar für die Praxis nebst CRR, Nebenbestimmungen und Mindestanforderungen. Loseblattwerk, Erich Schmidt Verlag, Berlin 2015, .

External resources 
First version of the law from December 1934 
Semi-official current text of the law 
Synopse recent changes of the KWG 

1935 in law
European Union corporate law
German business laws